Carlo Curti (4 November 1807 - 29 December 1872) was a Bolognese Italian cellist, educator and composer. He studied violin under Rolla (possibly Antonio Rolla), and then the cello under Parisini. He was made professor at the Liceo di Musica (the Royal School of Music in Parma) as a young man and in May 1838 became First Cello in the Teatro Regio in Parma when it was led by Nicola De Giovanni. He retired to Bologna, his home town and birthplace, in 1871 or 1872 and died from a cardiac condition caused by pneumonia soon after. The 17 May 1838 issue of the music journal Teatri Art E Letteratura pointed to him as him an example of Italian musical excellence, a gift to the world.

Works
Curti composed and arranged works for the cello and piano:
Souvenir sur La Sonnambula variato Vioncello
Divertimento dell'opera 'Il Trovatore'
Ricordanze dell' Opera L'Africana di Meyerbeer
Variate ricordanze dell'opera 'Un Ballo in Maschera'
La Viola del Pensiero
Il Pianto d'amore
Il Ferito morente per la patria
Rimembranze : melodie variate sull'opera La sonnambula del celebre m. Bellini
Divertimento sopra l'opera Aroldo del cav. G. Verdi
Ricordanze belliniane dell'opera Beatrice di Tenda
Souvenir dell'opera Rigoletto del cav. sig. G. Verdi
Variate ricordanze dell'opera Un Ballo in maschera del cav. G. Verdi
Gran pezzo di bravura
La pazza per amore : melodramma in due atti da rappresentarsi nel Teatro comunale di Bologna il carnevale del 1835 al 1836 / parole di Giacomo Ferretti ; musica del maestro p. Antonio Coppolaw
Clotilde : melodramma giocoso da rappresentarsi nel gran Teatro della Comune il carnevale del 1836-37 / [La musica è del rinomato sig. maestro Coccia]
Danao Re d'Argo : melodramma in due atti da rappresentarsi in Bologna nel Gran Teatro della Comune la primavera dell'anno 1836
Edoardo in Iscozia : dramma per musica in due atti da rappresentarsi nel Teatro Comunale di Bologna con ballo grande tragico intitolato Virginia nell'autunno dell'anno 1833 / [la poesia è del signor Gilardoni Domenico ; la musica è del celebre maestro signor Coccia Carlo]

References

External links 
Souvenir sur La Sonnambula variato Vioncello
Divertimento dell'opera 'Il Trovatore'
Ricordanze dell' Opera L'Africana di Meyerbeer
Variate ricordanze dell'opera 'Un Ballo in Maschera'
La Viola del Pensiero
Clipping from a book talking about an 1838 concert and mentioning cellist Carlo Curti.
Legal notice Milan 1827 for a Carlo Curti, son of Giuseppe Antonio Curti. May have nothing to do with this composer.

1807 births
1872 deaths
19th-century Italian composers
19th-century Italian male musicians
Italian cellists
Italian male composers
Italian music educators
Musicians from Bologna
Musicians from Parma